Boyden is a city in Sioux County, Iowa, United States. The population was 701 at the 2020 census.

Geography
Boyden's longitude and latitude coordinates in decimal form are 43.190221, -96.003698.

Demographics

2010 census
As of the census of 2010, there were 707 people, 279 households, and 208 families residing in the city. The racial makeup of the city was 93.6% White, 0.4% African American, 0.1% Native American, 1.1% Asian, 3.5% from other races, and 1.1% from two or more races. Hispanic or Latino of any race were 9.5% of the population.

There were 279 households, of which 34.1% had children under the age of 18 living with them, 63.8% were married couples living together, 6.8% had a female householder with no husband present, 3.9% had a male householder with no wife present, and 25.4% were non-families. 22.9% of all households were made up of individuals, and 9.7% had someone living alone who was 65 years of age or older. The average household size was 2.53 and the average family size was 2.97.

The median age in the city was 36.2 years. 27.9% of residents were under the age of 18; 7% were between the ages of 18 and 24; 24.9% were from 25 to 44; 23.5% were from 45 to 64; and 16.8% were 65 years of age or older. The gender makeup of the city was 50.5% male and 49.5% female.

2000 census
As of the census of 2000, there were 672 people, 275 households, and 207 families residing in the city. The racial makeup of the city was 97.62% White, 0.30% African American, 0.60% Asian, 1.19% from other races, and 0.30% from two or more races. Hispanic or Latino of any race were 2.08% of the population.

There were 275 households, out of which 33.8% had children under the age of 18 living with them, 66.2% were married couples living together, 6.5% had a female householder with no husband present, and 24.7% were non-families. 23.3% of all households were made up of individuals, and 13.8% had someone living alone who was 65 years of age or older. The average household size was 2.44 and the average family size was 2.88.

In the city, the population was spread out, with 25.4% under the age of 18, 8.6% from 18 to 24, 26.3% from 25 to 44, 19.0% from 45 to 64, and 20.5% who were 65 years of age or older. The median age was 38 years. For every 100 females, there were 106.1 males. For every 100 females age 18 and over, there were 98.8 males.

The median income for a household in the city was $39,688, and the median income for a family was $43,971. Males had a median income of $31,000 versus $18,958 for females. The per capita income for the city was $17,323. About 3.4% of families and 5.3% of the population were below the poverty line, including 2.9% of those under age 18 and 9.0% of those age 65 or over.

Education
Boyden–Hull Community School District includes Boyden in its boundary, and operates Boyden–Hull Elementary School in Boyden, and Boyden–Hull Junior/High School in Hull; the latter houses the district's headquarters.

Notable people
 John Kooiker, politician
 Sam Kooiker, politician
 Richard Vande Hoef. politician

See also

Floyd River

References

External links

City of Boyden

Cities in Iowa
Cities in Sioux County, Iowa
Populated places established in 1889
1889 establishments in Iowa